René De Silvestro (born 26 June 1996) is an Italian para alpine skier who competed at the 2018 and 2022 Winter Paralympics. He won a silver and bronze medal at the 2022 Winter Paralympics.

Career
Silvestro represented Italy at the 2018 Winter Paralympics and finished in seventh place in the slalom sitting event and eighth place in the giant slalom sitting event.

He competed at the 2021 World Para Snow Sports Championships and won a gold medal in the super combined sitting event, and a bronze medal in the Super-G sitting event.

He again competed at the 2022 Winter Paralympics and won a silver medal in the giant slalom and a bronze medal in the slalom sitting events.

References 

Living people
1996 births
Italian male alpine skiers
Alpine skiers at the 2018 Winter Paralympics
Alpine skiers at the 2022 Winter Paralympics
Medalists at the 2022 Winter Paralympics
Paralympic silver medalists for Italy
Paralympic bronze medalists for Italy
Paralympic medalists in alpine skiing
21st-century Italian people